Sarah Andrews may refer to:
Sarah Andrews (author), American author and geologist
Sarah Andrews (cricketer) (born 1981), Australian cricketer
Sarah Hollis Andrews (born 1962), English child actress
Sarah Shepherd Andrews (1892–1961), American missionary in Japan
Sarah Andrews (politician), South Australian politician, Member for Gibson